Tariq Azim Khan was Pakistan's Deputy Information Minister under Prime Minister Shaukat Aziz during Pervez Musharraf regime. His duties included speaking with foreign media and he heads 'The Pakistan Image Project'.

Career 
Tariq Azim Khan also served in the Senate of Pakistan from 2003 to 2012 PPP, PML teams meet Vajpayee Dawn (newspaper), Published 5 January 2004, Retrieved 3 February 2020</ref>

In 2012, he joined the Pakistan Muslim League (N). In October 2015, he was appointed as Pakistan's High Commissioner to Canada.

References 

Living people
Pakistan Muslim League (Q) politicians
Members of the Senate of Pakistan
Government of Shaukat Aziz
Pakistan Muslim League (N) politicians
High Commissioners of Pakistan to Canada
Year of birth missing (living people)